Richard Martin Werner (21 January 1903 – 2 October 1949) was a German sculptor and medalist. His work was part of the sculpture event in the art competition at the 1936 Summer Olympics.

Werner's last important work was the design of the reverse of the West-German 50 Pfennig coin. He never saw this popular coin in circulation, because of his early death in October 1949, just before this coin was issued for the first time by Bank deutscher Länder.

References

1903 births
1949 deaths
20th-century German sculptors
20th-century German male artists
German male sculptors
Olympic competitors in art competitions
People from Offenbach am Main